The Little Diplomat is a 1919 American silent comedy film directed by Stuart Paton and starring Marie Osborne, Lydia Knott and William Welsh.

Cast
 Marie Osborne as Little Marie 
 Lydia Knott as Mrs. Bradley West
 William Welsh as Bradley West
 Jack Connolly as Trent Gordon
 Murdock MacQuarrie as Raymond Brownleigh
 Velma Clay as Hulda
 Albert MacQuarrie as Kendall
 Betty Compson as Phyllis Dare
 Ernest Morrison as George Washington Jones Jr.

References

Bibliography
 Robert B. Connelly. The Silents: Silent Feature Films, 1910-36, Volume 40, Issue 2. December Press, 1998.

External links
 

1919 films
1919 comedy films
1910s English-language films
American silent feature films
Silent American comedy films
American black-and-white films
Films directed by Stuart Paton
Pathé Exchange films
1910s American films